Schoenoplectiella juncoides is a sedge (a member of the Cyperaceae family), native to east Asia and Oceania. It is a serious weed of rice paddies.

This sedge was first described by William Roxburgh as Scirpus junc(e)oides in 1814, in 1888, Eduard Palla transferred it to the genus Schoenoplectus and the accepted name was Schoenoplectus juncoides for many years. In 2003, it was transferred to the new genus Schoenoplectiella by Kaare Arnstein Lye.

References

External links

juncoides
Plants described in 1814